Abdul Momin Ismail (5 December 1927 – 17 May 2008) was a politician and diplomat from Brunei who previously served as a member in the Legislative Council and the Menteri Besar of Brunei.

Career 
Began working with the Brunei government in 1946. Belait District's acting district officer from August 1958 until 29 September 1959. From 1963 through 1969, he served as Belait District's district officer. While Dato Mohd Taib Besar was on vacation on 23 July 1969, he served as acting state secretary. Returned to his position as District Officer in Kuala Belait between 2 September and 1 October 1969. From April 1970 until May 1972, he became the State Secretary of Brunei.

On 15 July 1972, Sultan Hassanal Bolkiah appointed him as the new Menteri Besar of Brunei, and remained at this post through another council shuffle on 1 July 1974. He would hold that position until 31 August 1981. High Commissioner of Brunei to Malaysia from 1989 to 1990, concurrently served as non-resident High Commissioner to India from 1990 until 1993; on 24 November 1990, he handed his letters of credentials to President R Venkataraman. From 1993 until 1995, served as the High Commissioner of Brunei to China. Brunei's High Commissioner to the United States in 1995. Brunei's permanent representative to the United Nations from 1994 until 1995.

Member of the newly reformed Legislative Council on 6 September 2004.

Death 
Abdul Momin passed away at the age of 80 on 17 May 2008. The Sultan himself, expressed his sympathies at the family's Kampong Telanai home. He was buried at the Telanai Muslim Cemetery.

Personal life 
Married to Pengiran Anak Datin Paduka Hajah Siti Rafiah, and they have four kids; a son and three daughters, notably Noraini Abdul Momin

Honours 
Abdul Momin was given the title of Yang Amat Mulia Pengiran Dipa Negara Laila Diraja on 25 June 1970, and earned the following honours; 
  Family Order of Seri Utama (DK) – Dato Seri Utama
  Order of Seri Paduka Mahkota Brunei Second Class (DPMB) – Dato Paduka
  Order of Setia Negara Brunei Second Class (DSNB)  – Dato Setia
  Omar Ali Saifuddin Medal (POAS)
  Sultan Hassanal Bolkiah Medal (PHBS)
  Armed Forces Service Medal (PBLI)
  Meritorious Service Medal (PJK)
  Long Service Medal (PKL)

References 

1927 births

2008 deaths

Bruneian Muslims

Bruneian politicians
Chief Ministers of Brunei
Ambassadors of Brunei to China
High Commissioners of Brunei to Malaysia
Permanent Representatives of Brunei to the United Nations